"Can't Deny It" is the debut single by American rapper Fabolous from his debut studio album Ghetto Fabolous. It features Nate Dogg and uncredited backing vocals by Lil' Mo. The song was produced by Rick Rock. Its chorus contains similar lyrics to the chorus of 2Pac's "Ambitionz az a Ridah".

Official versions
 Can't Deny It (Album Version) / (LP Version) 5:04
 Can't Deny It (Radio Edit) 4:18

Charts

Weekly charts

Year-end charts

Personnel
 Aladdin – A&R
 Clue – Executive Producer, A&R
 Tom Coyne – Mastering
 E Bass – Producer
 Paul Gregory – Engineer
 Nick Howard – Engineer
 Just Blaze – Producer
 Rick Rock – Producer
 Skane – Executive Producer
 Jason Stasium – Engineer

References

External links

2001 songs
2001 debut singles
Fabolous songs
Elektra Records singles
Songs written by Fabolous
Songs written by Nate Dogg
Songs written by Lil' Mo
Gangsta rap songs